Qit'at Jaradah is a cay in the Persian Gulf to the east of Bahrain Island, located  east of Manama, the capital of Bahrain. Historically, the feature is above water only during spring low tide; it sits approximately midway between Bahrain and Qatar, within the  territorial waters of both countries. It was one of several maritime features contributing to a long running dispute between Bahrain and Qatar.

Geography
The opposing view is that it is a low-tide elevation. The feature is uninhabited and without vegetation.

History
Bahrain first claimed ownership of the cay in 1936, supported by the British Maritime Boundary Award of 1947. Qit'at Jaradah would be in Qatari waters with respect to the equidistant line that otherwise divides the nations in this area. The British were influenced by the de facto operations of oil companies at the time. This was consistent with the definition of an island of the Geneva Conference of 1958, which required an island to be above water at high tide. However, in 1959 the British attempted to reclassify Qit'at Jaradah as an island, as did the government of Bahrain in 1964. Qatar rejected this claim in 1965 and then sought international arbitration. Nothing resulted, since neither nation was a member of the United Nations until 1971. By 1986, Qatar declared several disputed areas, including Qit'at Jaradah, as military zones. As the two parties neared conflict, tensions were reduced under pressure from Oman, Saudi Arabia, and the UAE to resume the status quo ante. Saudi Arabia, through the Gulf Cooperation Council, attempted to negotiate a permanent agreement but was unsuccessful. In 1991, Qatar again sought arbitration by the International Court of Justice at The Hague.

2003 International Court of Justice ruling
In 2003, the International Court of Justice ruled by a 12–5 vote that Qit'at Jaradah was an island and that sovereignty belonged to Bahrain, although dissenting opinions questioned whether it should be considered an island given its small size, variable physical characteristics, and lack of firm ground. The court's ruling stated that "the activities carried out by Bahrain on that island must be considered sufficient to support Bahrain's claim that it has sovereignty over it." Bahrain's activities on the "island" included placing a navigation beacon, drilling an artesian well, and permitting fishing and oil exploration. This conclusion could not have been reached if the court had not ruled it an island, as sovereignty can be acquired by occupation only of an island, not a low-tide elevation. Qatar had argued that it had never been shown on navigation charts as an island and that even if not always completely submerged at high-tide, it still shouldn't be considered an island.

See also

Bahrain–Qatar relations
Territorial disputes in the Persian Gulf

References

Islands of Bahrain